Cecil Arthur 'Johnno' Rhodes (1901-1966) was an Australian rugby league footballer who played in the 1920s and 1930s.

Playing career
'Johnno' Rhodes played for Western Suburbs for six seasons between 1928 and 1933. He is remembered as a member of the winning premiership team of 1930 which was the club's first premiership and playing in the team that were runners up in 1932.

Death
Rhodes died on 11 November 1966 at Petersham, New South Wales.

References

1901 births
1966 deaths
Western Suburbs Magpies players
Australian rugby league players
Rugby league players from Sydney
Rugby league props